The Clackamas County Courthouse is an historic building in Oregon City, Oregon.

References

External links
 

Buildings and structures in Oregon City, Oregon
Clackamas County, Oregon
County courthouses in Oregon